The following is a complete list of Club Atlético Boca Juniors seasons since 1908 to present. Competitions contested include domestic and international cups and tournaments.

On 3 April 1905, a group of Greek and Italian boys (more specifically from Genoa) met in order to find a club. The house where the meeting was arranged was Esteban Baglietto's and the other four people who attended were Alfredo Scarpatti, Santiago Sana and brothers Ioannis (Juan) and Theodoros (Teodoro) Farengas from Chios and Konstantinos Karoulias from Samos.
Other important founders members include Arturo Penney, Marcelino Vergara, Luis Cerezo, Adolfo Taggio, Giovanelli, Donato Abbatángelo, Bertolini.

In 1925, Boca made its first trip to Europe to play in Spain, Germany and France. The squad played a total of 19 games, winning 15 of them. For that reason Boca was declared "Campeón de Honor" (Champion of Honour) for the 1925 season by the Association.

During successive years, Boca consolidated as one of the most popular teams of Argentina, with a huge number of fans not only in Argentina but worldwide. The club is one of the most successful teams in Argentine football, having won 35 Primera División titles, second only to River Plate with 37, and is the only team that has never been relegated to the second division.

Key 

Key to league record:
Pos = Final position
Pld = Played
W = Games won
D = Games drawn
L = Games lost
GF = Goals for
GA = Goals against
Pts = Points

Key to rounds:
NCC = No Champion Crowned
GS = Group stage
R1 = First Round
R2 = Second Round
R3 = Third Round
R4 = Fourth Round
R64 = Round of 64
R32 = Round of 32
R16 = Round of 16
QF = Quarter-finals
SF = Semi-finals
RU = Runners-up
W = Winners
DSQ = Disqualified

Key to tournaments:
CB = Copa Bullrich
CH = Copa de Honor
CC = Copa de Competencia
CCI = Copa Carlos Ibarguren
CE = Copa Estímulo
CBV = Copa Beccar Varela
CAE = Copa Adrián Escobar
CR = Campeonato de la República
CCB = Copa de Competencia Británica
CSu = Copa Suecia
CA = Copa Argentina
CCe = Copa Centenario
SA = Supercopa Argentina
CSA = Copa de la Superliga
CLP = Copa de la Liga Profesional
TC = Trofeo de Campeones de la Liga Profesional
SI = Supercopa Internacional

TC = Tie Cup
CHC = Copa de Honor Cousenier
CAl = Copa Aldao
CEG = Copa Escobar-Gerona
CL = Copa Libertadores
IC = Intercontinental Cup
CI = Copa Interamericana
SS = Supercopa Sudamericana
RS = Recopa Sudamericana
CMS = Copa Master de Supercopa
CO = Copa de Oro
CIb = Copa Iberoamericana
CM = Copa Mercosur
CS = Copa Sudamericana
CWC = FIFA Club World Cup

Seasons 
In 1908 the club affiliated the Argentine Football Association, playing in the Second Division and from 1913 to present days, Boca has participated in the Primera División, being the only club in Argentina to have played all seasons in the top division since it was promoted in 1912.

Boca has won 35 Primera División titles, 16 National cups, 18 CONMEBOL/FIFA titles and 4 AFA/AUF cups, achieving a total of 72 titles to date.

Boca Juniors also owns an honorary title awarded by the Argentine Football Association for their successful tour of Europe in 1925.

See also
 History of Boca Juniors

References

External links
 Historia on Boca Juniors website
 Historia de Boca, statistics and historic results

 
Real Madrid